Rakel Wahl (March 18, 1921 – December 14, 2005) was a Norwegian cross-country skier who competed in the 1950s. She finished sixth in the 10 km event at the 1952 Winter Olympics in Oslo.

Cross-country skiing results
All results are sourced from the International Ski Federation (FIS).

Olympic Games

World Championships

References

External links

1921 births
2005 deaths
Norwegian female cross-country skiers
Olympic cross-country skiers of Norway
Cross-country skiers at the 1952 Winter Olympics